Tremblay is a community in the Canadian province of New Brunswick on Route 315 and Route 11.

History

Notable people Jacques Doucet

See also
List of communities in New Brunswick

References

Communities in Gloucester County, New Brunswick
Designated places in New Brunswick
Local service districts of Gloucester County, New Brunswick